Bere Gratis (Romanian for Free Beer) is a Romanian pop rock band formed in 1998 in Bucharest, Romania.

Members
 Mihai 'Mitza' Georgescu (vocals)
 Robert Anghelescu (keyboards)
 Marian Damian (drums)

Albums
 De vânzare (LP, 2000)
 Vino mai aproape (LP, 2001)
 Acolo sus (LP, 2003)
 Electrophonica (LP live, 2004)
 Post Restant (LP, 2005)
 Ediție de buzunar (EP, 2006)
 Where We Go/Rosy (EP, 2007, "Relief Studio" Fribourg, Switzerland)
 Revoluție de catifea (LP, 2007)
 Vacanță la Roma (Single, 2009)
 Live X (LP live, 2009)
 Pe marele ecran (LP, 2009)
 O colecție (LP, 2010)
 În fața ta (LP, 2012)
 Tonomatul de vise (LP, 2016)

Videos
 Ce misto (2000)
 Ultra fete  (2000)
 Unu Mai (2001)
 Señor, señor (2001)
 Vino mai aproape (2001)
 Nebun (2002)
 Strazi albastre (2003)
 La tine as vrea sa vin (2003)
 Poveste de oras (2003)
 Cineva mă iubeste (2004)
 Iti mai aduci aminte (2004)
 Eu nu am sa te las (2004)
 Campuri de lupta (2005)
 Post Restant (2005)
 Speranta din priviri (2006)
 In brate (2007)
 Curcubeu (2008)
 Stai pe acelasi drum (2010)

The videos were played on main Romanian musical TV channels (MTV Romania, Kiss TV, U TV Romania and Atomic TV since 2000).

External links
 Article "Muzica e mai mult decat un job" in Monitorul de Sibiu

Sources
 Bere Gratis official website
 Artist page on CAT Music website
 Bere Gratis page on MySpace
 Stiumuzica.ro
 Muzicabuna.ro

Romanian pop music groups